Nirmala (Punjabi: ਨਿਰਮਲੇ, lit. "those without blemish") is a Sikh sect of ascetics. According to the traditional beliefs, the Sanatan Nirmala Sikh tradition was founded by Guru Gobind Singh in late 17th century when he sent five Sikhs to Varanasi to learn Sanskrit and Vedanta texts. 

The Nirmala Sikhs wear ochre-colored/Bhagwa robes (or at least one item) and keep kesh (unshorn hair). They observe the same birth and death rituals as the Hindu ascetics and have an akhara (martial organization) in Haridwar, and a number of deras in Punjab (India). They have been one of the procession participants in Kumbh Melas. They were early missionaries who traveled and spread Sikhism among the masses, thus making an important contribution to the growth of Sikhism. They often served as one of the mahants in Sikh temples (gurdwaras) during the 18th century. Nirmalas interpret the Sikh literature in Vedantic terms. During the Singh Sabha Movement of late 19th century and early 20th century, they were condemned by the Tat Khalsa faction of Sikhs, and cordially supported by the Sanatan Sikhs faction.

Origin 

The origin of the Nirmalas is uncertain. According to Khushwant Singh and other historians, the sect is first mentioned in the Sikh literature during the Guru Gobind Singh era, in the last decade of the 17th century. According to Nirmal Panth Pardipka, the Nirmala tradition has roots in the early history of Sikhism. In the 19th century, some Nirmala scholars traced their origin to the period of the first Sikh Guru, Nanak, but some others such as Khushwant Singh state that the Nirmala tradition was founded by the last Sikh Guru, Gobind Singh. The belief that the sect originated in the 17th century, according to W. H. McLeod, is of doubtful historicity because they are "scarcely mentioned" in Sikh literature before the 19th century.

According to the Nirmalas, in 1686, Guru Gobind Singh sent five Sikhs (Bir Singh, Ganda Singh, Karam Singh, Ram Singh and Saina Singh) to Varanasi to learn Sanskrit and classical Hindu literature. This began the Nirmala tradition. After they returned to Anandpur, they were honoured by the title Nirmala (Sanskrit for "pure" or "unsullied"). The Nirmalas took the Amrit initiation into the Khalsa panth. 

According to another account found in the late 19th-century Nirmal Panth Pardipika by the Nirmala scholar and Tat Khalsa supporter Giani Gian Singh, Guru Gobind Singh met a Sanskrit scholar named Pandit Raghunath in late 17th-century. He asked him to teach Sanskrit to Sikhs. However, Raghunath politely refused to do so, because he did not want to teach Sanskrit to Shudras. So Guru Gobind Singh sent some Sikhs dressed in upper-caste attire to Varanasi, where they became accomplished scholars of Indian theology and philosophy. The Pandit Raghunath-related story of Giani Gian Singh is likely ahistorical fiction.

The historicity of this account has been questioned because there are very few mentions of Nirmalas before the 19th century. Pashaura Singh and Louis E. Fenech hypothesize that the Nirmalas originated much later or may have descended from the Udasis, who are similar to them in ascetic lifestyle, celibacy and Vedantic interpretation of Sikh philosophy.

History 

Patronage from Sikh nobles, especially the rulers of the Phulkian states, helped the Nirmalas become a prominent religious order. Sardar Dhyan Singh of Shahbad willed his estate to Karam Singh Nirmala. In 1766, Sadda Singh of Bahirwala offered seven villages to Bhagat Singh Nirmala, although the latter declined the offer. Sardar Jai Singh's daughter-in-law granted two villages to the Nirmal dera at Kankhal.

Sardar Ganda Singh of Bhangi Misl offered 13 villages to Jai Singh Nirmala. In 1796, Maharaja Ranjit Singh also granted a sanad for land to Nihal Singh Nirmala. On both occasions, the Nirmalas passed on the properties to the Udasi akhara of Santokh Das.

Philosophy and practices 
Like the Udasis, the Nirmalas interpret the teachings of the Sikh Gurus in context of Vedanta. They view the first Sikh Guru, Nanak, as an Advaita Vedantist, a follower of Shankara, and a defender of the Sanatana dharma.

However, compared to the Udasis, the Nirmalas have shared a closer relationship the mainstream Khalsa Sikhs. Many prominent Nirmala sants preached mainstream Sikhism in Punjab, and Nirmala akharas have played an important role in training Sikhs. But after the Akali movement, the Khalsa attempts to create a Sikh identity completely distinct from Hindus made the Khalsa-Nirmala relationship fragile.

Locations 

The Nirmala Panchaati akhara at Kankhal, established with grants from the rulers of Phulkian states, has the highest status among all Nirmala chapters. Other major Nirmala centres are located at Haridwar, Allahabad, Ujjain, Trimbak, Kurukshetra and Patna.

Notable Nirmalas 
 Kavi Santokh Singh, (1787 - 1843), writer of historical Suraj Parkash
 Giani Gyan Singh, (1822-1921), Perhaps most prominent Nirmale in his time
 Sant Isher Singh Rara Sahib 
 Pundit Tara Singh (1822–1891), Punjabi and Sanskrit scholar
 Balbir Singh Seechewal, Prominent environmentalist

References

External links 
 Nirmal Ashram, Haridwar

Sikh groups and sects